Sir Peter Froggatt  (12 June 1928 − 3 May 2020) was a Northern Irish epidemiologist and academic. He served as Vice-Chancellor of the Queen's University, Belfast between 1976 and 1986.

He was the son of Albert Victor Froggatt and Edith Curran. He was educated at Royal Belfast Academical Institution, the Royal School, Armagh and Trinity College, Dublin.

References

1928 births
2020 deaths
Academics of Queen's University Belfast
Vice-Chancellors of Queen's University Belfast
Knights Bachelor
Fellows of the Royal College of Physicians of Ireland
British epidemiologists